James Beaton (or Bethune) (1473–1539) was a Roman Catholic Scottish church leader, the uncle of David Cardinal Beaton and the Keeper of the Great Seal of Scotland.

Life
James Beaton was the sixth and youngest son of John Beaton of Balfour, in Fife. He graduated as Master of Arts at St. Andrews University in 1493, was appointed Precentor of Dornoch Cathedral (Diocese of Caithness) in 1497 and in 1503 was appointed Provost of the Collegiate Church of Bothwell. In 1504 he became Prior of Whithorn and Abbot of Dunfermline and in 1505 was made Lord High Treasurer of Scotland by James IV.

In 1508 he was elected as Bishop of Galloway, in succession to George Vaus, but before his consecration he was chosen to succeed Robert Blackadder as Archbishop of Glasgow and was consecrated at Stirling on 15 April 1509. With the archbishopric he held the commendatory Abbeys of Arbroath and Kilwinning, and in 1515 he became Lord Chancellor of Scotland. King James V was at this time a child and Beaton, as one of the Council of Regency, was one of the most important people in the kingdom during the minority of the young king.

In 1522 Beaton was transferred to St. Andrews bishopric, vacant by the death of Archbishop Forman. As primate he threw all his powerful influence into the scale against the intrigues of Henry VIII to obtain predominance in Scotland. 
He was chiefly responsible for the king's action in allying himself with France and not with England. The English ambassador described him as "greatest man both of lands and experience within this realm, and noted to be very crafty and dissimulating".

His residence in the capital, Edinburgh, was at the foot of Blackfriars Wynd on the Cowgate. This had a courtyard form and the coat-of-arms of the Bethune family over the entrance.

In 1528 he ordered Patrick Hamilton burned for heresy. The Regent Albany's jealousy had deprived Beaton of the chancellorship some years previously, and he was never reappointed, though he enjoyed the full favour of the king. A few months after the second marriage of James to Mary of Guise, the primate got his nephew Cardinal Beaton appointed his coadjutor with right of succession. Archbishop James Beaton died in the autumn of 1539 in his castle at St. Andrews.

References

Further reading
 
 

Abbots of Arbroath
Abbots of Dunfermline
Abbots of Kilwinning
Roman Catholic archbishops of Glasgow
Archbishops of St Andrews
Bishops of Galloway (pre-Reformation)
16th-century Scottish Roman Catholic bishops
Keepers of the Great Seal of Scotland
Lord chancellors of Scotland
Alumni of the University of St Andrews
Chancellors of the University of St Andrews
1473 births
1539 deaths
Founders of Scottish schools and colleges
Court of James V of Scotland
Lord High Treasurers of Scotland
People from Fife
16th-century Roman Catholic archbishops in Scotland